The 1997 Kentucky Derby was the 123rd running of the Kentucky Derby. The race took place on May 3, 1997, and was won by Silver Charm, ridden by Gary Stevens.  There were 141,981 in attendance.

Payout
The 123rd Kentucky Derby Payout Schedule

 $2 Exacta: (6-5)  Paid   $31.00
 $2 Trifecta: (6-5-12)  Paid   $205.40
 $1 Superfecta: (6-5-12-8)  Paid   $350.00

Full results

References

1997
Kentucky Derby
Derby
Kentucky
Kentucky Derby